Scopophobia, scoptophobia, or ophthalmophobia is an anxiety disorder characterized by a morbid fear of being seen in public or stared at by others. 

Similar phobias include erythrophobia, the fear of blushing, and an epileptic's fear of being looked at, which may itself precipitate such an attack. Scopophobia is also commonly associated with schizophrenia and other psychiatric disorders. Often, scopophobia will result in symptoms common with other anxiety disorders. Scopophobia is considered both a social phobia and a specific phobia.

Origin of the term
The term scopophobia comes from the Greek σκοπέω skopeō, "look to, examine", and φόβος phobos, "fear". Ophthalmophobia comes from the Greek ὀφθαλμός ophthalmos, "eye".

Signs and symptoms
Individuals with scopophobia generally exhibit symptoms in social situations when attention is brought upon them like public speaking. Several other triggers exist to cause social anxiety. Some examples include: Being introduced to new people, being teased and/or criticized, embarrassing easily, and even answering a cell phone call in public.

Often scopophobia will result in symptoms common with other anxiety disorders. The symptoms of scopophobia include an irrational feelings of panic, feelings of terror, feelings of dread, rapid heartbeat, shortness of breath, nausea, dry mouth, trembling, anxiety and avoidance. Other symptoms related to scopophobia may be hyperventilation, muscle tension, dizziness, uncontrollable shaking or trembling, excessive eye watering and redness of the eyes.

Related syndromes
Though scopophobia is a solitary disorder, many individuals with scopophobia also commonly experience other anxiety disorders. Scopophobia has been related to many other irrational fears and phobias. Specific phobias and syndromes that are similar to scopophobia include erythrophobia, the fear of blushing (which is found especially in young people), and an epileptic's fear of being looked at, which may itself precipitate such an attack. Scopophobia is also commonly associated with schizophrenia and other psychiatric disorders. It is not considered indicative of other disorders, but is rather considered as a psychological problem that may be treated independently.

Sociologist Erving Goffman suggested that shying away from casual glances in the street remained one of the characteristic symptoms of psychosis in public. Many scopophobia patients develop habits of voyeurism or exhibitionism. Another related, yet very different syndrome, scopophilia, is the excessive enjoyment of looking at erotic items.

Causes
Scopophobia is unique among phobias in that the fear of being looked at is considered both a social phobia and a specific phobia, because it is a specific occurrence which takes place in a social setting. Most phobias typically fall in either one category or the other but scopophobia can be placed in both. On the other hand, as with most phobias, scopophobia generally arises from a traumatic event in the person's life. With scopophobia, it is likely that the person was subjected to public ridicule as a child. Additionally, a person with scopophobia may often be the subject to public staring, possibly due to a physical disability. 

According to the Social Phobia/Social Anxiety Association, U.S. government data for 2012 suggests that social anxiety affects over 7% of the population at any given time. Stretched over a lifetime, the percentage increases to 13%.

Psychoanalytic views
Building on Freud's concept of the eye as an erogenous zone, psychoanalysts have linked scopophobia to a (repressed) fear of looking, as well as to an inhibition of exhibitionism. Freud also referred to scopophobia as a "dread of the evil eye" and "the function of observing and criticizing the self" during his research into the "eye" and "transformed I's."

In some explanations, the equation of being looked at with a feeling of being criticized or despised reveals shame as a motivating force behind scopophobia. In the self-consciousness of adolescence, with its increasing awareness of the Other as constitutive of the looking glass self, shame may exacerbate feelings of erythrophobia and scopophobia.

Treatments
There are several options for treatment of scopophobia. With one option, desensitization, the patient is stared at for a prolonged period and then describes their feelings. The hope is that the individual will either be desensitized to being stared at or will discover the root of their scopophobia.

Exposure therapy, another treatment commonly prescribed, has five steps:
 Evaluation
 Feedback
 Developing a fear hierarchy
 Exposure
 Building

In the evaluation stage, the scopophobic individual would describe their fear to the therapist and try to find out when and why this fear developed. The feedback stage is when the therapist offers a way of treating the phobia. A fear hierarchy is then developed, where the individual creates a list of scenarios involving their fear, with each one becoming worse and worse. Exposure involves the individual being exposed to the scenarios and situations in their fear hierarchy. Finally, building is when the patient, comfortable with one step, moves on to the next.

As with many human health problems support groups exist for scopophobic individuals. Being around other people who face the same issues can often create a more comfortable environment.

Other suggested treatments for scopophobia include hypnotherapy, neuro-linguistic programming (NLP), and energy psychology. In extreme cases of scopophobia, it is possible for the subject to be prescribed anti–anxiety medications. Medications may include benzodiazepines, antidepressants, or beta-blockers.

History  
Phobias have a long history. The concept of social phobias was referred to as long ago as 400 B.C. One of the first references to scopophobia was by Hippocrates who commented on an overly-shy individual, explaining that such a person "loves darkness as light" and "thinks every man observes him.” 

The term "social phobia" (phobie sociale) was first coined in 1903 by French psychiatrist Pierre Janet. He used this term to describe patients of his who exhibited a fear of being observed as they were participating in daily activities such as talking, playing the piano or writing.

In 1906 the psychiatric journal The Alienist and Neurologist, described scopophobia:

Later in the same paper (p. 285) scopophobia is defined as "a fear of seeing people or being seen, especially of strange faces".

In popular culture
 In The Neverending Story, the Acharis are a race of beings so ashamed of their ugliness that they never appear in daylight.
The character Ryōshi Morino in Ōkami-san has the condition, wearing his hair long to avoid eye contact, and breaking down crying when he notices people staring at him.
The character Marimo Kaburagi in the second season of the anime series Active Raid has scopophobia, but her symptoms are alleviated by her wearing special glasses which digitally censor the eyes of whomever she looks at.
The SCP Foundation character SCP-096 is a humanoid monster that expresses great distress and reacts violently whenever its face is seen through any medium, hunting down whoever saw it; this is typically avoided via showing an artistic depiction to prevent direct viewing.

See also

Gaze
Generalized other
Ideas of reference and delusions of reference
List of phobias
Social stigma
Stage fright
Psychosexual development

References

Further reading
 Moss Hart, Lady in the Dark (New York 1941)

Phobias